Piz Cotschen, also named Rötlspitz or Punta Rosa, is a mountain of the Ortler Alps, overlooking both the Umbrail and Stelvio Pass. Its summit is located within the Swiss canton of Graubünden, near the border with Italy.

References

External links
 Piz Cotschen on Hikr.org

Ortler Alps
Mountains of Graubünden
Mountains of the Alps
Alpine three-thousanders
Mountains partially in Italy
Mountains of Switzerland
Val Müstair